Didem Karagenç (born 16 October 1993) is a Turkish women's football defender currently playing in the First League for Beşiktaş with jersey number 3. She is a member of the Turkish national team.

Private life 
Didem Karagenç was born in Ankara, Turkey, on 16 October 1993. She works as a teacher of physical education and sports in a school.

Club career 

Karagenç received her license for Sakarya Yenikent Güneşspor on 27 October 2004, where she was until January 2007. During this time, no leagues were held in the country. With the reestablishment of the women's football leagues, she transferred to her hometown club Gazi Üniversitesispor. In the six seasons, she played for Gazi Üniversitesispor, she capped 70 times, scored a total of 32 goals, and enjoyed three league championships in 2006–07, 2007–08 and 2009–10.

For the 2012–13 season, she signed for te İzmir-based club Konak Belediyespor. She became again champion in her first season with the team.
 
She played with Konak Belediyespor at the 2013–14 UEFA Women's Champions League in the qualification round matches in August 2013 and in the knockout stage matches in October 2013.

By October 2015, she transferred to the Istanbul-based team Beşiktaş J.K. to play in the Second League. At the end of the 2015–16 season, she enjoyed the league champion title and the promotion of her team to the First League. At the end of the 2018-19 First League season, she enjoyed the champion title of her team. She took part at the 2019–20 UEFA Women's Champions League - Group 9 matches.

In the 2020-21 Turkcell Women's Football League season, she enjoyed the second champion title with her team.  She played in two matches of the 2021–22 UEFA Women's Champions League qualifying rounds.

International career 

Didem Karagenç was called up to the Turkey girls' U-17 national team debuting in the match against Ireland at the 2009 UEFA Women's U-17 Championship qualifying round on 18 October 2008. She played also against the teams Netherlands and Faroe Islands at the same competition. She participated at the 2010 UEFA Women's U-17 Championship qualifying playing against Denmark, Ireland and Slovenia. She capped 16 times and scored two goals in the girls' U-17 national team.

On 19 September 2009 she made her first appearance in the women's U-19 national team playing against Serbia at the 2010 UEFA Women's U-19 Championship First qualifying round – Group 7 match. At the same tournament, she played also against France and Georgia. Karagenç participated at the 2010 UEFA Women's U-19 Championship Second qualifying round – Group 1 matches against Sweden, Ireland and England. her further appearances in the women's U-19 national team were at the 2011 UEFA Women's U-19 Championship First qualifying round – Group 9 (Romania, Czech Republic and Northern Ireland), at the 2012 UEFA Women's U-19 Championship Second qualifying round (Iceland, Germany and Wales) as well as at the 2012 UEFA Women's U-19 Championship – Group A (Portugal, Denmark and Romania). In the women's U-19 national team, she capped 32 times netting one goal.

She played for the first time for the women's national team on 15 April 2009 in a friendly match with Belarusian women. Karagenç was team member in the 2011 FIFA Women's World Cup qualification – UEFA Group 5 match against Austria. She played in nine matches of the UEFA Women's Euro 2013 qualifying – Group 2 round against Germany, Switzerland, Spain, Romania and Kazakhstan. In 2013, Karagenç took part at the 2015 FIFA Women's World Cup qualification – UEFA Group 6 matches against the English and Montenegron women.

Karagenç appeared in four games of the UEFA Women's Euro 2017 qualifying Group 5 against Croatia, Russia and Hungary.

Career statistics 
.

Honours 
Turkish Women's First Football League
Gazi Üniversitesispor
 Winners (3): 2006–07, 2007–08, 2009–10
 Third places (1): 2008–09

Konak Belediyespor
 Winners (3): 2012–13, 2013–14, 2014–15

Beşiktaş J.K.
 Winners (2): 2018–19, 2020–21
 Runners-up (2): 2016–17, 2017–18

Turkish Women's Second Football League
Beşiktaş J.K.
 Runners-up (1): 2015–16

References 

Living people
1993 births
Sportspeople from Ankara
Turkish women's footballers
Women's association football defenders
Turkey women's international footballers
Turkish schoolteachers
Gazi Üniversitesispor players
Konak Belediyespor players
Beşiktaş J.K. women's football players
Turkish Women's Football Super League players